Adrian Armand Bărar (15 January 1960 – 8 March 2021) was a Romanian guitarist and composer.

Biography

Bărar was the founder of the Heavy metal band Cargo. He died from COVID-19 on 8 March 2021, in his hometown of Timișoara during the COVID-19 pandemic in Romania. He also had other health problems.

References

External links
 

1960 births
2021 deaths
Musicians from Timișoara
Romanian guitarists
Deaths from the COVID-19 pandemic in Romania